The canton of Brou is an administrative division of the Eure-et-Loir department, northern France. Its borders were modified at the French canton reorganisation which came into effect in March 2015. Its seat is in Brou.

It consists of the following communes:
 
Les Autels-Villevillon
Authon-du-Perche
La Bazoche-Gouet
Beaumont-les-Autels
Béthonvilliers
Brou
Chapelle-Guillaume
Chapelle-Royale
Charbonnières
Cloyes-les-Trois-Rivières
Commune nouvelle d'Arrou
Coudray-au-Perche
Dampierre-sous-Brou
Les Étilleux
Frazé
Gohory
Luigny
Miermaigne
Montigny-le-Chartif
Mottereau
Moulhard
Saint-Bomer
Unverre
Yèvres

References

Cantons of Eure-et-Loir